Maculolachnus is a genus of true bugs belonging to the family Aphididae.

The species of this genus are found in Europe and Northern America.

Species:
 Maculolachnus rubi Ghosh & Raychaudhuri, 1972 
 Maculolachnus sijpkensi Hille Ris Lambers, 1962

References

Aphididae